Shree Gyanodaya Secondary School is a school in Kawasoti, Nawalparasi, Nepal It was established in 1984 A.D .

Establishment
Shree Gyanodaya Secondary School was established in 1984 (2040 B.S.) coinciding with the coronation of Birendra Bir Bikram Shah. This day has since come to be observed as Education Day in Nepal.

Facilities

Gyanodaya Day School
Gyanodaya Residential School
Gyanodaya Higher Secondary School
Gyanodaya College
Gyanodaya Social Service Division

Gyanodaya Residential School
With an ever-growing student population coming from almost all entire 75 districts of Nepal, there was a demand on the school management from the parent community to provide for a residential facility.

The Residential School caters to boarding education for children from the valley as well as outside. It has about 350 students studying from Grade I to X. It is on its own premises at Kawasoti, about 30 km on the outskirts of Chitwan and easily accessible by road. It is in a land sprawling an area of over 100 ropanies surrounded by the forested slopes of the Hatiban hills in the southwest and verdant agricultural cultivation in the terraced slopes of the hills in the northeast. 
The school is equipped with playgrounds, auditorium, IT access, audio-visual aids, science laboratory and a library. It has a team to attend to the health needs of the hostel inmates.

Gyanodaya Higher Secondary School
The higher secondary wing by the name Gyanodaya Higher Secondary School was registered with the Higher Secondary Education Board in 1996 and started the 10+2 classes in the three streams of science, management and humanities.

Initially, the classes for 10+2 were conducted in the same premises of Gyanodaya Secondary School at Kawasoti but a separate infrastructure has been developed with its own compound at Nawalparasi.

Gyanodaya College
The college has a Bachelor’s wing called Gyanodaya College, established in 2015 as an affiliate of Tribhuvan University, Kathmandu. It runs a three-year management programme leading to a bachelor's degree in Business Studies (BBS).

Gyanodaya Social Service
The Social Service Division was inaugurated at kawasoti. This marked the culmination of years of Gyanodaya's informal involvement in social service and community work to uplift the condition of the deprived and underprivileged as well as help in the rehabilitation of the victims of natural calamities. At the community level, it means the realization of the education aspirations of many underprivileged and backward community children and illiterate women.

The division has a pre-primary school with classroom, teaching aids, play area and library. It provides free uniforms and footwear to children attending the school. It runs informal education classes for women at the centre every day from Sunday to Friday from 10 a.m. to 4 p.m. Presently, some 30 children and a sizeable number of women are benefiting from the programmes run at the centre.

School Anthem
Going all the way in life
Yearning to learn everyday
Awaken us in truth and wisdom
Never afraid come what may
Oh! God, we pray to you; we pray to you with a humble heart
Don't let us fool our humble life; pretending to be always smart
And give us courage, perseverance
Yes oh! Lord, teach us all
Always fill our heart with gratitude, to all those who make life possible

1984 establishments in Nepal
Educational institutions established in 1984
Secondary schools in Nepal